Nyxetes is a genus of true weevils, belonging to the tribe Eugnomini. There is a single species, Nyxetes bidens, which is endemic to New Zealand.

References

Curculionidae genera